Chiloglottis × pescottiana, commonly known as the bronze bird orchid, is a species of orchid endemic to south-eastern Australia. It has two broad leaves and a single greenish bronze or purplish brown flower with a black, ant-like callus on the labellum. It is a natural hybrid formed from a cross between Chiloglottis valida and C. trapeziformis.

Description
Flowering occurs from August to November.

Taxonomy and naming
The bronze bird orchid was first formally described in 1918 by Richard Sanders Rogers who gave it the name Chiloglottis pescottiana and the description was published in Proceedings of the Royal Society of Victoria from a specimen collected near Tallangatta. The specific epithet (pescottiana) honours "Mr. E. E. Pescott" who sent Rogers the type specimens. In 1997 the hybrid origin of this orchid was confirmed.

Distribution and habitat
Chiloglottis × pescottiana grows in open forest and coastal scrub mostly in eastern Victoria but also in the far south-east of New South Wales.

References

External links 

pescottiana
Orchids of New South Wales
Orchids of Victoria (Australia)
Plants described in 1877
Orchid hybrids